Stefano D'Arrigo (15 October 1919 – 2 May 1992) was an Italian writer.  He published three books, the collection of poetry Codice Siciliano (The Sicilian Code), the epic Horcynus Orca (Killer Whale) and the novel Cima delle Nobildonne.

D'Arrigo was born in Alì Terme, in the province of Messina. He graduated from the University of Messina, where a park is named in his honour.

He worked on Horcynus Orca from about 1950 until it was published in 1975.  Originally it was called La testa del delfino, and was renamed I giorni della fera (that became I Fatti della Fera) for its first planned publication in 1961 on the review Menabó, directed by Elio Vittorini.  In 2000, the galley proofs of I fatti della fera were published, giving readers a chance to compare the two versions: 1961's 660 pages, and 1975's 1,270. D’Arrigo dedicated Horcynus Orca to his wife Jutta Bruto because she helped him in the drafting of it.  As of 2022, the work has not been translated into English.  An excerpt appears in Peter Forbes's translation of Primo Levi's anthology, The Search for Roots.

In 1961 D'Arrigo played a minor role in Pasolini’s first film, Accattone.

He died in 1992 in Rome.

Filmography

References

D'Arrigo
D'Arrigo
D'Arrigo, Stefano
20th-century Italian novelists
20th-century Italian male writers
University of Messina alumni
20th-century Italian poets
Italian male novelists
Italian male poets